Andar Bahaar is a 1984 Hindi-language action film. Produced By Romu Sippy and directed by Raj N. Sippy, the film is a remake of the 1982 Hollywood film 48 Hrs.. The film stars Anil Kapoor, Jackie Shroff, Moon Moon Sen and Danny Denzongpa in the lead roles. The film's music is by R. D. Burman.

Story
The notorious criminal Shera enlists the help of small time crook and expert safe-cracker Raja to help him rob a bank. The robbery goes without a hitch, but Shera, wanting all the loot for himself, shoots Raja. Their third partner Gulshan flees with the loot, abandoning Shera. The sound of a gunshot brings Inspector Ajay Sahani to the scene. He arrests Shera and Raja, who are only wounded by the bullet.

With help from his loyal crony Gangu, Shera escapes from prison. He then kidnaps Gulshan's sister and keeps her with him until Gulshan can give him all the money from the loot. Gulshan panics and informs the police about Shera's hideout. Inspectors Sahani and his friend Inspector Ravi Khanna both reach the scene but fail to apprehend Shera, who flees after fatally shooting Inspector Sahani.

Filled with rage and vengeance, Ravi gets permission from the Police Commissioner to release Raja in his custody so that he may help him track down Shera. Initially, Ravi and Raja knock heads and often get into arguments. But after Raja saves Ravi's life, they become good friends. After a lot of investigative work and dangerous encounters, the two eventually manage to arrest Shera.

Cast

Anil Kapoor as Raja
Jackie Shroff as Ravi Khanna
Moon Moon Sen as Reema
Danny Denzongpa as Shamsher Singh "Shera"
Gulshan Grover as Gulshan
Parikshat Sahni as Ajay Sahani
Kim as Monica
Huma Khan as Gulshan's sister
Viju Khote as Bartender
Beena Banerjee as Beena Sahani
Sulochana Latkar as Ravi's mother
Murad as Judge
M. Rajan as Jailor
Gurbachan Singh as Gangu
Satyendra Kapoor as Reema And Beena Father (Cameo Role)
Sudhir as the robber at Jewellery Store (Uncredited)
Mac Mohan as Police Informer of Ravi Khanna (Uncredited)
Kaajal Kiran as a girl who meets Raja At Swimming Pool (Uncredited)
Anita Raj as a Girl that meets  Raja Outside the central Jail (Uncredited)
Jayshree T. as Reshma

Soundtrack
The music for the film was composed by R. D. Burman, with lyrics by Gulshan Bawra. The playback singers used were Shailendra Singh and Suresh Wadkar for the male actors and Asha Bhosle for all the female actors.

Controversy
Anil Kapoor and Jackie Shroff had issues about credits that  each one wanted his name would display first.

References

External links 
 

1984 action thriller films
1984 comedy films
1984 films
1980s buddy comedy films
1980s buddy cop films
1980s Hindi-language films
Fictional portrayals of police departments in India
Films directed by Raj N. Sippy
Films scored by R. D. Burman
Films with screenplays by Sachin Bhowmick
Hindi films remade in other languages
Indian action thriller films
Indian buddy comedy films
Indian police films
Indian remakes of American films
1980s masala films